The Southern Oregon AVA is an American Viticultural Area which lies in Southern Oregon, United States.  The Southern Oregon AVA was established in 2005 and was created to include the land of two smaller AVAs: the Rogue Valley AVA and the Umpqua Valley AVA.  Southern Oregon AVA was established to allow the two principal winegrowing regions in the southern part of the state to market themselves jointly.  This creation of a "super-AVA" is a departure from the trend in the Willamette Valley AVA or northern Oregon of establishing smaller AVAs specific to a particular locale's climate or soil conditions.

Description 
The Southern Oregon AVA is the union of the Umpqua Valley AVA and the Rogue Valley AVA, and all land suitable for grape cultivation within the Southern Oregon AVA is also located in one of these smaller regions.  A small strip of connecting territory is included in the Southern Oregon AVA to make it a contiguous region, however, this strip passes through mountainous regions not suitable for viticulture.  The AVA lies entirely within the southwest corner of the state, south of Eugene and west of the Cascades, and consists of the river valleys of the Rogue and Umpqua River rivers and their tributaries.

Umpqua Valley AVA 

The Umpqua Valley AVA contains the drainage basin of the Umpqua River, excluding mountainous regions. It has a warmer climate than the Willamette Valley, but cooler than the Rogue Valley to the south.  Grapes grown here include Pinot Noir, with smaller amounts of Pinot Gris, Cabernet Sauvignon, Chardonnay, and Riesling, as well as several French-American hybrids.

Red Hill Douglas County, Oregon AVA 
The Red Hill Douglas County, Oregon AVA is entirely contained within the Umpqua Valley AVA.  This AVA includes , and is located near Yoncalla. Originally petitioned as the "Red Hill AVA", the proposed appellation brought protest from Willamette Valley vintners, where a region known as Red Hill is also located; the name of "Red Hill Douglas County" was instead chosen to avoid consumer confusion.

Elkton, Oregon AVA 

The Elkton AVA is entirely contained within the Umpqua Valley AVA.  This AVA includes  and is located near Elkton.

Rogue Valley AVA 

The Rogue Valley AVA includes the drainage basin of the Rogue River and several tributaries, including the Illinois River, the Applegate River, and Bear Creek. Most wineries in the region are found in the valleys formed by one of these three tributaries, rather than along the Rogue River itself. Each river valley has a unique terroir, and grows different varieties of grapes. Overall, however, this region is the warmest and driest of Oregon's winegrowing regions.

Illinois Valley 
The westernmost tributary is the Illinois River, which rises in southern Josephine County, in the Red Buttes Wilderness.  The river flows generally northwest along the west side of the Klamath Mountains, past Cave Junction and Kerby then through the Siskiyou National Forest. It joins the Rogue River from the south on the Curry–Josephine county line, approximately 15 mi (24 km) from the Pacific Ocean.  The region is marked by its high elevation and is significantly influenced by marine climates.  The region is well suited for growing Burgundy varietals, similar to those grown in the Willamette Valley.

Applegate Valley AVA 
The Applegate Valley AVA, established in 2000, is the only sub-AVA in the Rogue Valley AVA. The Applegate River flows through the town of Applegate and near the city of Jacksonville, the location of Oregon's first winery (which has been restored and reopened as Valley View Winery).
Grapes that thrive here include Merlot, Cabernet Sauvignon, Syrah, Chardonnay and Zinfandel, with Cabernet and Merlot being the dominant varietals.

Bear Creek Valley 
Bear Creek is the most populated of the Rogue River tributaries, as it flows through the cities of Medford and Ashland. The climate of the Bear Creek Valley is similar to that of Bordeaux, and it is well suited for cultivating varietals such as Cabernet Sauvignon, Merlot, Chardonnay, Cabernet Franc, Pinot gris, Sauvignon blanc, Malbec and Syrah.

References 

American Viticultural Areas
Geography of Douglas County, Oregon
Geography of Jackson County, Oregon
Geography of Josephine County, Oregon
Oregon wine
2005 establishments in Oregon